Tega Tosin Richard (born 13 November 1992) is a Nigerian female wrestler. She competed at the 2010 Commonwealth Games and clinched bronze medal in the women's 59kg freestyle event. She also won a silver medal in the women's 63kg freestyle event at the 2010 African Wrestling Championships.

References

External links 
Profile at Wrestling Federation

1992 births
Living people
Nigerian female sport wrestlers
Wrestlers at the 2010 Commonwealth Games
Commonwealth Games medallists in wrestling
Commonwealth Games silver medallists for Nigeria
Place of birth missing (living people)
21st-century Nigerian women
Medallists at the 2010 Commonwealth Games